Om Prasad Ojha is a Nepalese politician, belonging to the Communist Party of Nepal (Unified Marxist-Leninist). He was elected to the Pratinidhi Sabha in the 1999 election from the Taplejung-2 constituency with 10402 votes.

References

Communist Party of Nepal (Unified Marxist–Leninist) politicians
Living people
Year of birth missing (living people)
Nepal MPs 1999–2002